The 13th annual 2009 Webby Awards were held in New York City on June 8, 2009. They were hosted by SNL head writer Seth Meyers, and the lifetime achievement award was given to Jimmy Fallon. The awards were judged by the 650-person International Academy of Digital Arts and Sciences, and winners were selected from among nearly 10,000 entries from 60 countries and all 50 United States. Voting by the public was available prior to April 30, and over 500,000 votes were cast. The awards ceremony was made available for viewers via the official Webby YouTube channel.

Nominees and winners

(from http://www.webbyawards.com/winners/2009)

Notes
Winners and nominees are generally named according to the organization or website winning the award, although the recipient is, technically, the web design firm or internal department that created the winning site and in the case of corporate websites, the designer's client.  Web links are provided for informational purposes, both in the most recently available archive.org version before the awards ceremony and, where available, the current website.  Many older websites no longer exist, are redirected, or have been substantially redesigned.

References

External links
Official website

2009
2009 awards in the United States
2009 in New York City
June 2009 events in the United States
2009 in Internet culture